Ibraheem Al-Alawi (Arabic:إبراهيم العلوي) (born 10 October 1991) is an Emirati footballer who plays as a right back.

Career

Al-Wahda
Al-Alawi started his career at Al-Wahda and is a product of the Al-Wahda's youth system. On 26 October 2017, Al-Alawi made his professional debut for Al-Wahda against Dubai in the Pro League, replacing Khaled Jalal.

Al-Wasl
On season 2013, left Al-Wahda and signed with Al-Wasl. On 27 September 2013, Al-Alawi made his professional debut for Al-Wasl against All-Shaab in the Pro League, replacing Khalifa Abdullah.

Al-Fujairah
On 3 July 2014, left Al-Wasl and signed with Al-Fujairah. On 15 September 2014, Al-Alawi made his professional debut for Al-Fujairah against Emirates Club in the Pro League.

Al-Dhafra
On 2 June 2016, left Al-Fujairah and signed with Al-Dhafra. On 28 April 2016, Al-Alawi made his professional debut for Al-Dhafa against Al-Shabab in the Pro League, replacing Abdulrahim Jumaa.

References

External links
 

1991 births
Living people
Emirati footballers
Al Wahda FC players
Al-Wasl F.C. players
Fujairah FC players
Al Dhafra FC players
UAE Pro League players
Association football fullbacks
Place of birth missing (living people)